Zaneylan-e Sofla (also Romanized as Zaneylān-e Soflá; also known as Zeynalān-e Pā’īn) is a village in Jalalvand Rural District, Firuzabad District, Kermanshah County, Kermanshah Province, Iran. At the 2006 census, its population was 109, in 23 families.

References 

Populated places in Kermanshah County